Voll may refer to:

Places

Norway
Voll, Akershus, a village area in Bærum municipality in Viken county
Voll, Møre og Romsdal, a former municipality in Møre og Romsdal county
Voll, Rauma, a village area in Rauma municipality in Møre og Romsdal county
Voll Church, a church in Rauma municipality, Møre og Romsdal county, Norway
Voll, Rogaland, a village in Klepp municipality in Rogaland county
Voll, Trøndelag, a village in Rennebu municipality in Trøndelag county

People with the surname
Christoph Voll (1897-1939), German sculptor and graphic artist associated with Expressionism
Daniel Voll, American journalist
Jacqueline Voll (born 1987), Dutch figure skater
John J. Voll (1922-1987), career officer in the United States Air Force and a World War II flying ace
Toomas Voll (born 1958), Estonian composer, conductor and choir director

Other uses
VoLL, or Value of lost load

Surnames from nicknames